Parodia scopa (syn. Notocactus scopa), the silver ball cactus, is a species of flowering plant in the cactus family Cactaceae, native to upland southern Brazil and Uruguay.

The specific epithet scopa means "broom" and refers to the long spines. The species was transferred from Notocactus to Parodia in 1997 by David Hunt.

The subspecies P. scopa subsp. scopa has gained the Royal Horticultural Society's Award of Garden Merit.

References

scopa
Flora of Brazil
Flora of South America
Flora of Uruguay